The purple reeffish (Chromis scotti) is a species of fish in the family Pomacentridae. It occurs from southern Florida through the Caribbean Sea to northern Brazil. The specific name honours William Beverly Scott (1917-2014) who was the Curator of Ichthyology and Herpetology at the Royal Ontario Museum in Toronto.

References

External links
 

purple reeffish
Fauna of the Southeastern United States
Fish of the Caribbean
Fish of the Dominican Republic
purple reeffish